Kesou Khagba was the Representative of the President of Abkhazia in Ukraine from 1992 to 1995. From 1995 to 1999, Khagba was Minister of Culture and from 2000 to 2004, a Deputy of the People's Assembly of Abkhazia. He co-founded the newspaper Novy Den. Khagba was born in 1950 in the village Duripsh in Gudauta District.

References

1950 births
Living people
People from Gudauta District
Ministers for Culture of Abkhazia
3rd convocation of the People's Assembly of Abkhazia